is a Japanese gravure idol, tarento, and professional wrestler. She was born in Yokohama, Kanagawa Prefecture.

As a tarento
After graduating from Eiwa Girls College, she was scouted and became a part-time manager of an entertainment office because she was interested in managing work. She was auditioned at the recommendation of the president of her office and started to perform gravure and made television appearances.

As a professional wrestler
Kato was scouted by World Wonder Ring Stardom GM Fuka Kakimoto.

On 14 November 2011 she passed the pro-tests with the other third graders. On 25 December, she made her debut with Natsuki Taiyo. At that time her ring name was Yuri Haruka.

In September 2012, she suffered an injury during a kickboxing practice which caused a long absence.

On 14 August 2013 she returned to wrestling.

She made her full return to the WNC Wrestle Battlefield Convention on 26 January 2014 in a duo with Kaho Kobayashi, she played against Makoto and Miyako Matsumoto, but succumbed to Makoto's spear move. Her ring name used was her real name, and her costume was also renewed.

On 30 March 2014 she appeared in her sixth Shinshu Girls battle with Koyuki Hayashi.

In 2015, she joined JWP Joshi Puroresu with Eri who was renamed from Eri Susae and later joined the "JWP Tag League the Best". On 8 March 2015 she took part in Stardom's Shinkiba Competition. On 14 June, at the Stadium Korakuen Hall Competition, her fight with Hatsuhinode Kamen became her first solo victory.

After the Stadium Shinkiba Competition on 29 May 2016, due to worsening of asthma, she took a break from her wrestling career. She returned the following year.

Filmography

Television
 "Pu'" Suma (EX)
 Ariken (TX)
 Shimura-ya desu. (CX)
 Rank Ōkoku (TBS)
 Onegai! Ranking (EX)
 Marusummers (TBS)
 Ano News de Tokusuru Hito Sonsuru Hito (NTV)

Ring girl
 Jewels

DVD
 Haruka Kato Harukawa! (30 Aug 2013, Grasso)
 Yūnaru Chōsen! Anata no Heart ni Udejūji Harukawa Returns Yū yarimasu!! (28 Mar 2014, Grasso)

Championships and accomplishments
DDT Pro-Wrestling
GWC 6-Man Tag Team Championship (1 time, current) – with Keisuke Ishii and Kouki Iwasaki

See also
 List of Japanese gravure idols
 List of professional wrestling rosters

References

External links
  – Ameba Blog (31 December 2007 – ) 
  – GREE ( – 31 August 2014) 
 Yuri Haruka's Fighting Idol Training Plan (16 May 2011 – 12 September 2012) 

Japanese gravure idols
Japanese television personalities
Japanese female professional wrestlers
1989 births
Living people
Sportspeople from Yokohama